Vladislav Ivanov (born 24 January 1986) is a Russian former professional footballer. He played the position of midfielder and forward.

Career
On 1 March 2012 Ivanov joined JK Sillamäe Kalev and instantly became a key player for the team, leading Meistriliiga's top scorers list with six goals in nine matches. His stay at Sillamäe was cut short when his contract was terminated by the club on 9 May 2012 due to disciplinary reasons. Surprisingly, Ivanov featured in Kalev's next match only a few days later, when he was substituted in at the end of the first half. The player said that the initial decision was made hastily and both he and the club agreed to continue working together on a short-term deal.

Ivanov took part of a friendly between JK Narva Trans and FC Zenit Saint Petersburg on 25 July 2012 and rejoined his old club in Narva on 30 July 2012. Although both teams, he played for in 2012, finished outside the podium, he was the top scorer of the competition with 23 goals.

Honours

Club

Narva Trans
 Meistriliiga runners-up (1): 2006
 Estonian Supercup (1): 2007

Levadia Tallinn
 Meistriliiga (1): 2009
 Meistriliiga runners-up (1): 2010
 Estonian Cup (1): 2009–10
 Estonian Supercup (1): 2010

Luch-Energiya Vladivostok
 Russian Second Division, East zone (1): 2012–13

Individual
 Meistriliiga Top Scorer: 2012 (23 goals)

References

External links
 
 Profile on Soccernet.ee
 Guardian's Stats Centre
 

1986 births
Living people
Sportspeople from Narva
FC Karpaty Lviv players
Tartu JK Tammeka players
FCI Levadia Tallinn players
Russian footballers
Expatriate footballers in Estonia
Estonian people of Russian descent
Expatriate footballers in Ukraine
JK Narva Trans players
FC Torpedo Moscow players
Expatriate footballers in Greece
Russian expatriate footballers
FC Luch Vladivostok players
Expatriate footballers in Uzbekistan
FCI Tallinn players
Esiliiga players
Meistriliiga players
JK Sillamäe Kalev players
Association football forwards
FC Khimik Dzerzhinsk players
Ida-Virumaa FC Alliance players
JK Maag Tartu players